Gangsta (stylized as GANGSTA.) is a Japanese manga series written and illustrated by Kohske.  It has been published in Shinchosha's Monthly Comic @BUNCH magazine since March 2011.  The series has inspired a spin-off manga, an audio drama series, an anime television series, and an original novel. The anime series was the last to be produced by Manglobe before its bankruptcy in two days after the anime had ended.

Premise
Two "Handymen" named Worick Arcangelo snd Nicolas Brown, works in the town of Ergastulum, which is full of mafia, hoodlums, prostitutes, and dirty cops.  The duo takes on jobs for both the mob and the police force that no one else can handle. After a job of crushing a gang, Worick decided to spare and help the (amnesiac) sole survivor Alex under their wing for the time being.

Characters

Main characters
Worick Arcangelo

 (formerly Wallace Arcangelo) is Nic's partner.  He has been a gigolo since he was thirteen, and views it as his main job.  Nic worked as Worick's personal guard, bearing witness to the abuse his father put him through. Nic killed Worick's abusive family (with Worick's permission) twenty-two years ago in a fit of psychotic rage after witnessing Worick's father press a lit cigarette into his left eye, which to this day he wears a patch over.  He has hyperthymesia and carries a M1911A1 pistol.

Nicolas Brown

, or Nic, is a "Twilight", or someone with superhuman abilities gained from the drug Celebrer. Nic is the result of a former West Gate mercenary named Gaston Brown sleeping with a Twilight prostitute. Gaston had impregnated the prostitute for the sole purpose of avoiding the expense of hiring a Tagged mercenary, and murdered the woman after Nic was born. Nic was abused by Gaston, who saw him as nothing more than a monster.  He is deaf, and communicates primarily through sign language, but has exceptionally strong vision and lip reading skills.  As a child mercenary, he was hired by the Arcangelo family to be Worick's bodyguard.  Like all Twilights, he is identified by the dog tags that he wears.  With his natural ability, he is a B/5 level Twilight, but gains A/0 level by overdosing on Celebrer.

Alex Benedetto

, or Ally, is a former prostitute.  She joins the Handymen after the police have Nic and Worick eliminate the gang she was working for, and Worick decides to spare her life. Alex was previously under the control of Barry Abbott, who is suspected to have drugged her to keep her submissive. She only remembers a few things, including her name, and later it is revealed that she is not from Ergustulum, the setting of this series and other reason she is not familiar with life in there. She is learning sign language in order to communicate better with Nic, and on several occasions has comforted Worick when the latter was in the throes of a nightmare. She is a calm, caring person who is unafraid of violence when Worick, Nic, or Nina, are threatened. She is revealed to be a talented singer and occasionally works for the Cristiano family in that capacity. She has a younger brother named Emilio, who she worked to support, but hasn't seen him since childhood.

Supporting characters

Dr. Theo

 is a doctor who supplies Nic and other Twilights with Celebrer and other treatments.  He runs a small clinic in District 7 and tries to stay neutral between the rival gangs.  He is missing two fingers on his left hand. Dr. Theo is a kind person except when his clinic and Nina are threatened.

Nina

 is a young girl who works at Dr. Theo's clinic as a nurse, and is close friends with Worick and Nicolas.

Chad Adkins

 is a police officer in Ergastulum.  He hires Nic and Worick to do jobs for the police and often has to clean up their messes when they get into trouble. There are indications in the manga that when Nic and Worick were young teens that Adkins acted as a protector and surrogate father to them.

Daniel Monroe

 is a mafia boss, and head of one of the three main 'gangs' in Ergastulum. He is Nic's former employer.

Delico

 is a rank D/0 Twilight who works for the Monroe Family.

Loretta Cristiano Amodio

Fourteen year old daughter of the former boss and current leader of the Cristiano family. She uses her family's resources to help Twilights in need. Her associates and de facto protectors are Marco Adriano (who has superhuman strength) and Galahad Woeher (a Twilight).

Sir Gina Paulklee

Referred to as 'Sir' by her subordinates, she is a Twilight and head of the Paulklee Guild, which takes in rogue Twilights and hires them out. Gina believes strongly in the Three Laws that govern Twilights, which are based on Asimov's Three Laws of Robotics: No action can be taken against 'normals', obey your master, defend yourself. She is taller than Nic, which is something he comments that he hates.

Ginger

 is a highly ranked Twilight and member of the Paulklee Guild. She is seemingly Gina Paulklee's Right-hand. She is a rank S/5 Twilight.

Doug

 is a rank A/0 Twilight, like Nic.  He worked for the Paulklee Guild and was roommates with Galahad Woeher.

Joel Raveau

 is an old woman who runs a shop in Ergastulum, and a frequent customer of the Handymen.

Uranos Corsica

 is the head of the Corsica Family.  He has a large scar on his forehead.  He bears an intense dislike toward Twilights.

Constance Raveau

 is the owner of a gun shop who is on friendly terms with the handymen.

Media

Manga
The manga, which is written and illustrated by Kohske, was launched in March 2011 in Shinchosha's Monthly Comic @ Bunch magazine. Gangsta. is the author's first manga series, after she debuted in Shōnen Gangan in 2009 with a short story. Viz Media announced in July 2013 that it had acquired the rights to publish Gangsta. in North America, with plans to release a new volume on a tri-monthly basis.  The series went on hiatus due to Kohske's health in November 2015.  In January 2016, she posted on Twitter that she was preparing to resume the series. The series resumed publication on 20 May 2017.

The manga inspired a spin-off series, titled Gangsta.:Cursed. EP_Marco Adriano, which began serialization in the fourth volume of the Quarterly Comic Go Go Bunch magazine, preceded by a prologue in the third volume, which was published on 9 April 2014.  The series is illustrated by Syuhei Kamo.  Gangsta.:Cursed. EP_Marco Adriano focuses on mafia staff member Marco Adriano, a character from the original manga.  The first collected volume was published on 9 July 2015. In December 2016, Viz Media announced that it had licensed the manga and would release it on December 20. Go Go Bunch ceased publication in 2018, and the manga's final chapter was featured in the last issue on February 9, 2018.  Viz Media announced in April 2016 that it had licensed the series under the title Gangsta.: Cursed.

List of volumes
The series has been collected into eight tankōbon volumes, seven of which have been republished in English.  The fifth volume made it onto The New York Times manga best sellers list, ranking at number three.

Gangsta.: Cursed

Audio drama
The manga has been adapted into a series of audio drama CDs, released by Frontier Works, the first of which was released on 21 August 2014.  The series was originally intended to end with the third CD, but five have been released as of June 2015.  It was announced in November 2015 that the sixth and seventh CDs, scheduled for 25 November 2015 and 27 January 2016, respectively, had been delayed until further notice.  They were eventually released in March and May 2016.

Anime
An anime adaptation was announced through a wrap-around jacket on the sixth tankōbon volume in Japan. It was later confirmed through the series' official Twitter account for the drama CD and anime project that it would be a TV anime, and would be produced by Manglobe as their final anime television series before succumbing to bankruptcy. The series is directed by Shūkō Murase and Kōichi Hatsumi, with character designs by Yōichi Ueda and music by Tsutchie. Shinichi Inotsume is in charge of series composition, while Koichi Hatsumi serves as series director. Additional crew include Masahiro Kubota (art design), Masatoshi Kai (art direction), Yuuko Saitou (color design), and Shinobu Tsuneki (prop design). Yuuichirou Nagata from Asahi Production serves as the series' director of photography. Tomoki Nagasaka is the series' editor, and Yukio Nagasaki serves as sound director. The cast from the audio drama return to voice their characters in the anime.

The series began airing in Japan on 1 July 2015, and was broadcast on Asahi Broadcasting Corporation (ABC), Tokyo MX, TV Aichi, and BS11 in Japan, and was streamed on the Bandai Channel and Niconico.  The anime is licensed by Funimation in North America, and was simulcast on their website as it aired in Japan.  Funimation also streamed an English dub of the series. Crunchyroll licensed the series for simulcast in France and French speaking territories (Belgium, Luxembourg, Switzerland, Andorra, Monaco, Tunisia, Algeria, Morocco, New Caledonia, and Quebec). AnimeLab licensed the series for simulcast streaming in Australia and New Zealand, and Anime Limited licensed the series for streaming on Viewster in the United Kingdom.  The series switched from a Wednesday broadcast date to a Sunday one starting with the fifth episode.

List of episodes

Home video
The first two episodes were released on Blu-ray/DVD on 25 September 2015, with each further two episodes originally scheduled to be released once a month, followed by the complete box set on 24 February 2016.  Starting with the third volume, however, the home video releases were delayed until further notice.  The releases were finally resumed 16 months after the original delay, with the third volume released on 24 March 2017 and the sixth and final volume released simultaneously with the complete set on 23 June 2017.

Novel
An original novel based on the series and written by Jun'ichi Kawabata was released on 1 August 2015 as part of Shinchosha's Shincho Bunko nex series.

Reception
Rebecca Silverman, reviewing the first English volume for the Anime News Network, gave it an overall score of B+, giving the story a B+ grade and the art a grade of B.  She was positive toward the characters and story, commenting that the author "makes some interesting choices with her characters", but felt the art was occasionally subpar, pointing out an image that was reused three times, and commented that the name of the city "sounds like some sort of stomach disorder".  Reviewing the second volume, she remarked on improvements in the author's art style and praised the development of Worick, but criticized Alex's reduced presence.  She was also positive toward the third volume, writing "Gangsta. is so gritty that you kind of feel like brushing off your skin after reading it, but it's that way with a purpose that is starting to become clear and it's going to feel like a really long wait for volume four".

Reviewing the first three episodes of the anime, Gabriella Ekens stated that it was "a languid execution of a promising story".  She also criticized the series' musical score and animation. She stated, however, that she was looking forward to the show, and that "its flaws are as intriguing as its strengths."

References

External links

  
  
 

2014 radio dramas
2015 Japanese television series endings
2015 Japanese novels
Adventure anime and manga
Anime series based on manga
Bandai Visual
Funimation
Japanese crime television series
Japanese radio dramas
Literature about deaf people
Manglobe
Neo-noir
Organized crime in anime and manga
Shinchosha books
Shinchosha manga
Seinen manga
Television shows about deaf people
Thriller anime and manga
Viz Media manga